Walter Cook VC (18 June 1834 – c. 1864) was an English recipient of the Victoria Cross, the highest and most prestigious award for gallantry in the face of the enemy that can be awarded to British and Commonwealth forces.

He was about 25 years old, and a private in the 42nd Regiment (later The Black Watch (Royal Highlanders), British Army during the Indian Mutiny when the following deed took place on 15 January 1859 at Maylah Ghat, India for which he and Private Duncan Millar were awarded the VC:

The pipe tune Lawson's Men was written about the incident.

References

Monuments to Courage (David Harvey, 1999)
The Register of the Victoria Cross (This England, 1997)
Scotland's Forgotten Valour (Graham Ross, 1995)

External links
 

Indian Rebellion of 1857 recipients of the Victoria Cross
British recipients of the Victoria Cross
Black Watch soldiers
1834 births
1864 deaths
Military personnel from London
Accidental deaths in India
Deaths by drowning in India
British Army recipients of the Victoria Cross
British people in colonial India